Sulaiman Areeb ( 05 April 1922 - 07 September 1972) was an Indian poet from Aurangabad.

Life

Areeb was of Hadhrami Arab Muslim ancestry. His forebears migrated from the Hadramaut to the city of Hyderabad to work under the Nizam of Hyderabad. His father Sulaiman bin Abd al-Razzaq was a commissioned officer in the Hyderabad State Forces. He was married twice, the second time to Safia Begum, who herself was an Urdu teacher and writer.

He started his literary career at an early age. Initially, he wrote essays and short stories but later turned to poetry. He became known after the independence of India.

He was editor and publisher of Saba (The Breeze), an Urdu literary magazine established in 1955. It played an important role in popularizing modern literary trends and concepts.

Areeb was an active member of the Communist Party of India (CPI) and champion of the Progressive Writers Movement. He strongly supported the Telangana Peasants' Revolt along with other progressive Urdu writers of Hyderabad in order to give equality and civil rights to the native Hindu population and end the discrimination and oppression perpetrated by the Muslims.

His poems have been translated into other languages, including English.

Work and contribution 
Pas-e-Gareban  (Publication Hyderabad Anjuman Taraqqi Urdu 1961)
Hyderabad Ke Sha'ir Vol II

Further reading 
Sulaimān Arīb, Shakhsiyat awr Fun by Ghausiyah Sultāna,
 Life and works of Sulaimān Arīb, 1922–1970, Urdu poet.  Published in 1999.

References

External links
 http://www.awazsayeed.com/Khake/suleman_areeb.htm

1922 births
1972 deaths
Urdu-language poets from India
20th-century Indian Muslims
Writers from Hyderabad, India
Indian people of Yemeni descent
Hadhrami people
20th-century Indian poets
Indian male poets
Poets from Andhra Pradesh
20th-century Indian male writers